Xaver Hörmann (21 February 1910 – 23 February 1943) was a German sprint canoeist who competed in the late 1930s. He won a bronze medal in the folding K-1 10000 m event at the 1936 Summer Olympics in Berlin.

Hörmann was killed in action during World War II.

References

External links
 
 
 
 

1910 births
1943 deaths
Canoeists at the 1936 Summer Olympics
German male canoeists
Olympic canoeists of Germany
Olympic bronze medalists for Germany
Olympic medalists in canoeing
Medalists at the 1936 Summer Olympics
German military personnel killed in World War II